The Brusilov offensive ( Brusilovskiĭ proryv, literally: "Brusilov's breakthrough"), also known as the "June advance", of June to September 1916 was the Russian Empire's greatest feat of arms during World War I, and among the most lethal offensives in world history. The historian Graydon Tunstall called the Brusilov offensive the worst crisis of World War I for Austria-Hungary and the Triple Entente's greatest victory, but it came at a tremendous loss of life. The heavy casualties eliminated the offensive power of the Imperial Russian Army and contributed to Russia's collapse the next year.

The offensive involved a major Russian attack against the armies of the Central Powers on the Eastern Front. Launched on 4 June 1916, it lasted until late September. It took place in eastern Galicia (present-day northwestern Ukraine), in the Lviv and Volyn Oblasts. The offensive is named after the commander in charge of the Southwestern Front of the Imperial Russian Army, General Aleksei Brusilov. The largest and most lethal offensive of the war, the effects of the Brusilov offensive were far-reaching. It relieved German pressure on French forces at Verdun, and helped to relieve the Austro-Hungarian pressure on the Italians. It inflicted irreparable losses on the Austro-Hungarian Army, and induced Romania to finally enter the war on the side of the Entente. The human and material losses on the Russian side also greatly contributed to the onset of the Russian Revolution the following year.

Background
Under the terms of their Chantilly Agreement of December 1915, Russia, France, Britain and Italy committed to simultaneous attacks against the Central Powers in the summer of 1916. Russia felt reluctantly obliged to lend troops to fight in France and Salonika, and to attack on the Eastern Front, in the hope of obtaining munitions from Britain and France.

In March 1916 the Russians initiated the disastrous Lake Naroch offensive in the Vilnius area, during which the Germans suffered only one-fifth as many casualties as the Russians. This offensive took place at French request – General Joseph Joffre had hoped that the Germans would transfer more units to the east after the Battle of Verdun began in February 1916.

At a war council held with senior commanders and the Tsar in April 1916, General Aleksei Brusilov presented a plan to the Stavka (the Russian high command), proposing a massive offensive by his Southwestern Front against the Austro-Hungarian forces in Galicia. Brusilov's plan aimed to take some of the pressure off French and British armies in France and the Italian Army along the Isonzo Front and, if possible, to knock Austria-Hungary out of the war.

Besides the complacency felt by the Germans and Austro-Hungarians after their successful defense of Russian attacks that winter and March, the Austro-Hungarians were in the midst of implementing their plans to knock Italy out of the war. Conrad had transferred Kövess' troops from the Balkans as well as four divisions from the Eastern Front. According to Prit Buttar, "To make matters worse, many of the experienced divisions on the Eastern Front were withdrawn and sent to the Alps, and replaced by formations largely composed of new inexperienced recruits."

Prelude

General Alexei Evert, commander of the Russian Western Army Group based in Smolensk, favored a defensive strategy and opposed Brusilov's proposed offensive. Emperor Nicholas II had taken personal command of the Imperial Russian army in September 1915. Evert was a strong supporter of Nicholas and the Romanovs, but the Emperor approved Brusilov's plan. The offensive aimed to capture the cities of Kovel and Lviv (in present-day western Ukraine); the Central Powers had recovered both these cities in 1915. Although the Stavka had approved Brusilov's plan, his request for supporting offensives by the neighboring fronts (the Western under Evert and Northern under Aleksey Kuropatkin) was denied.

On 26 May, the tsar issued orders for accelerating the start of the Russian summer offensive, in response to pleas from the Italians facing Conrad's offensive.  Brusilov would attack on 4 June, and the rest of the Russian Army ten days later. Brusilov chose Kaledin's Eighth Army to spearhead the capture of Lutsk and Kovel.  Kaledin's attacking force included the XXXII Corps in the south, the VIII and XL Corps in the center, and XXXIX Corps in the north. The Russians fielded 148 infantry battalions against the 53 battalions in Joseph Ferdinand's Fourth Army. Further south on the Austro-Hungarian front were Paul Puhallo von Brlog's First Army, Eduard von Böhm-Ermolli's Second Army, and Karl von Pflanzer-Baltin's Seventh Army.

Mounting pressure from the western Allies caused the Russians to hurry their preparations. Brusilov amassed four armies totaling 40 infantry divisions and 15 cavalry divisions.  He faced 39 Austrian infantry divisions and 10 cavalry divisions, formed in a row of three defensive lines, as well as German reinforcements that were later brought up. Deception efforts on the Russian side were intended to conceal the point of attack. They included false radio traffic, false orders sent by messengers who were intended to be captured, and equipment displays including dummy artillery. Brusilov, knowing he would not receive significant reinforcements, moved his reserves up to the front line. He used them to dig entrenchments about  along the front line. These provided shelter for the troops and hindered observation by the Austrians.

Brusilov extended his army's trenches forward as far as possible, in some cases to within 100m of the Austro-Hungarian positions.  Tunnels were also dug below the Russian barbed wire, allowing the entanglements to remain intact during the Russian attack.  By these methods Brusilov hoped to lessen the exposure, and increase the surprise, of his attacking troops. Instead of massed formations, each of Brusilov's armies would attack along a 15 km wide sector of their choice, attacking in waves with two reinforced infantry corps.

Breakthrough
On 4 June, the Russians opened the offensive with heavy artillery fire. Alexander Winogradsky's artillery brigade used 76mm guns to open 24 breaches in the Austrian defenses, coordinated in advance with the infantry commanders. Winogradsky wrote, this was followed by a "creeping barrage in front of the assault infantry...while the 152mm howitzers and 122mm guns attacked hard points." This was followed by attacks by infantry in Kaledin's Eighth Army, Sakharov's Eleventh Army, Shcherbachev's Seventh Army, and Lechitsky's Ninth Army.

On 5 June, according to Prit Buttar, "...the Russian gunners resumed their careful demolition work of the defences of Joseph Ferdinand's Fourth Army... After two days of careful artillery fire and infantry attacks, Kaledin was confident their success was close. His troops had overrun both the first and second lines of enemy defences, and had inflicted heavy losses on the Austro-Hungarian Fourth army." Ferdinand was almost out of artillery ammunition, had used all of his reserves, and was forced to seek help from Linsingen's Army of the Bug to the north.

By the end of 6 June, The X and UU Corps, plus Sándor Szurmay's Corps, of the Austro-Hungarian Fourth Army, had been pushed back to the Styr and beyond, while Kaledin's XL and II Corps pushed onward to Lutsk. By the end of 7 June, the Fourth Army retreat was unstoppable, with many elements of the X Corps surrendering when caught against the river, or casualties in attempts to cross. Fourth Army supplies abandoned in Lutsk went up in flames as the Russians occupied the town.  Further south, Pflanzer-Baltin's Seventh Army was pushed back to the Strypa, as Scherbachev's Seventh Army captured Jazłowiek.

The first major attack was against the 117,800 strong Habsburg Fourth Army, in the northernmost sector of the front. The initial attack was successful, and the Austro-Hungarian lines were broken, enabling three of Brusilov's four armies to advance on a wide front (see: Battle of Kostiuchnówka). Within four days of the offensive, the Habsburg Fourth Army saw its strength fall from 117,800 men to just 35,000, a fall of nearly 70 per cent. The southern sector was held by the Habsburg Seventh Army, which by 8 June lost 76,200 of its 194,200 soldiers.

Archduke Joseph Ferdinand was replaced by Karl Tersztyánszky von Nádas as Fourth Army commander, and Hugo Martiny was replaced by Smekal as X Corps commander. After four days into the offensive, Buttar states, "Brusilov's revolutionary tactics had been stunningly successful: artillery had been used with a precision that was unprecedented; infantry had worked their way close to the defences before launching their attacks; and those attacks had not used the traditional lines of men that were so easy for machineguns and defensive artillery to destroy."  However, Brusilov was informed by Alexeyev that Evert's West Front would not be able to commence their attacks before 18 June.  Meanwhile, Linsingen ordered Friedrich von Bernhardi to gather German forces for a counterattack.

Battle

On 8 June, in response to appeals for help from Conrad, Erich von Falkenhayn organized five German divisions under the command of Linsingen, concentrating them near Kovel for a counterattack.  Brusilov moved to protect his northern flank, while all of his armies continued to maintain pressure all along his Southwest Front.

On 9 and 10 June, Lechitsky's Ninth Army advanced upon Doroschoutz, Okna and Czarny Potok, as Pflanzer-Baltin's Seventh Army troops retreated.  According to Buttar, "It was a graphic demonstration of Brusilov's theories. Pressure across a broad front forced the defenders to commit their reserves and left no sectors that could release troops to aid others." By 11 June, Pflanzer-Baltin's Gruppe Benigni and XII Corps were forming new defensive lines to the west, as his XI Corps retreated south across the Prut.  According to Buttar, adding those killed, wounded, or taken prisoner, "...the Austro-Hungarian Seventh Army was a shadow of its former self."

On 11 June, Felix Graf von Bothmer's South Army prepared a counterattack using Arthur Arz von Straußenburg's VI Corps. However, Scherbachev was ready and the front line remained unchanged.

On 11 June, while pursuing the Austro-Hungarian Army in Bukovina, Russian forces inadvertently crossed into Romanian territory, where they overwhelmed the border guard at Mamornița and had a cavalry patrol disarmed and interned at Herța. Having no intention to force the hand of the Romanian Government, the Russians quickly left Romanian territory.

Lechitsky kept the XXIII and XLI Corps moving westward, while the XII and XI Corps advanced south to capture Czernowitz, and III Cavalry Corps threatened Kolomea.  By 12 June his Russian troops were attacking Austro-Hungarian positions along the Pruth, and crossing that river by 14 June. By then, the Austro-Hungarian losses amounted to 205,000, of which 150,000 were prisoners.

On 17 June, the Russians captured Czernowitz, and Alexeyev transferred the Third Army from Evert's West Front to Brusilov's Southwest Front.  Meanwhile, Bothmer's South Army prepared to attack southwards, hoping Pflanzer-Baltin's Seventh Army could hold its ground.

On 18 June, Lechitsky was able to capture Kolomea.  On 19 June, Russian cavalry, led by Mikhail Promtov crossed the Siret, and on 20 June reached the Carpathian Foothills.  However, by the end of June, Southwest Front's casualties amounted to a costly 285,000.

On 15 June, Linsingen ordered a counterattack, concentrating around the Lutsk salient formed by Kaledin's offensive. Attacking forces included Puhallo's First Army, Tersztyánsky's Fourth Army, Georg von der Marwitz's German X Corps, and Gruppe Bernhardi.  However, after three days of fighting, little was changed in the position of the front lines, even after the addition of Gruppe Falkenhayn on 21 June. Linsingen then decided to reinforce that attack group in a thrust towards Lutsk, but under the command of Marwitz, with the attack to commence on 30 June.  Brusilov was preparing his own continued offensive, with Leonid Lesh's Third Army advancing towards Pinsk, Kaledin's Eight Army towards Kovel, the Eleventh Army towards Brody, while the Seventh and Ninth Armies continued their advance.  Brusilov met the German attacks on the Lutsk salient flanks by attacking in turn the German flanks.  However, the Germans achieved only moderate success, pushing back the Russian XLV Corps 5 km.

From 27 June to 3 July 1916, Brusilov carried out, on his own initiative, the deportation of 13,000 German civilians from the Volhynian areas that had been conquered during the offensive.

On 2 July, Evert's West Front finally started its offensive, with Alexander Ragoza's Fourth army attacking north of Baranovichi. Yet, according to Buttar, "it was in almost every respect a replay of the disastrous attacks of March...an imprecise artillery bombardment, mass infantry attacks that struggled to make progress and lacked sufficient support to sustain early gains...". On 9 July, Evert suspended the operation, with the Fourth army losing 80,000, having advanced only 5 km.  Likewise, Kuropatkin's Northern Front offensive in mid-July failed to appreciably change the front line.

On 4 July, attacks by Lesh's Third Army and Kaledin's Eight Army forced Linsingen to withdraw westwards to the Stochod river on 6 July. On 5 July Archduke Karl took command of the new Twelfth Army, while on 9 July, Kövesz Third Army was created from a portion of Pflanzer-Baltin's Seventh Army that had retreated westward.  Pflanzer-Baltin remained in command of the Seventh Army that had retreated towards the Carpathians.

Recognizing Southwest Front had the best chance to advance the Russian front lines, Ragoza's Fourth Army was dispersed into Brusilov's Second and Tenth Armies, and Brusilov was given Bezobrazov's Guards Army.  Southwest Front now had a force of 700,000 men, compared to an opposition force of 421,000.  Brusilov planned to advance towards Kovel on 20 July.  Before then, on 16 July, the Siberian Corps forced Gruppe Marwitz to retreat back to the River Lipa. In an attempt to strengthen Marwitz, Puhallo's First Army was disbanded, and redistributed to Marwitz and Böhm-Ermolli's Second Army.

On 23 July, Sakharov's Eleventh Army attacked towards Brody, capturing it on 28 July, forcing Böhm-Ermolli's Second Army 7 km to the west.  On 28 July, Hindenburg was placed in command of the front up to the Austro-Hungarian Second Army, with Archduke Karl in command from that point south.

On 24 July, artillery preparations began for the Russian assault in the Battle of Kovel.  According to Buttar, "The fighting that extended from 28 July into early August was curiously disjointed...Although Lesh, Bezobrazov and Kaledin all launched their attacks on the same day, none of them were able to maintain their efforts for long..."  Lechitsky's Ninth Army and Shcherbachev's Seventh Army made simultaneous attacks further south, with Lechitsky able to advance the front line to outside Stanislau, capturing it on 11 August.

On 7 August, Brusilov resumed his offensive to take Kovel. By 8 August, the Germans and Austro-Hungarians had stopped the Russians, and on 9 August, Brusilov halted any further attempt to take Kovel. The offensive was essentially over, according to Buttar, "Attacks continued on until the autumn rains turned the roads to mud, but other than add to the already terrible casualty list, nothing was achieved."

Aftermath

Brusilov's operation achieved its original goal of forcing Germany to halt its attack on Verdun and transfer considerable forces to the East.  Afterward, the Austro-Hungarian army increasingly had to rely on the support of the German army for its military successes. On the other hand, the German army did not suffer much from the operation and retained most of its offensive power afterward. The early success of the offensive convinced Romania to enter the war on the side of the Entente, which led to the failure of the 1916 campaign. The Brusilov Offensive was the high point of the Russian effort during World War I, and was a manifestation of good leadership and planning on the part of the Imperial Russian Army coupled with great skill of the lower ranks. According to John Keegan, "the Brusilov Offensive was, on the scale by which success was measured in the foot-by-foot fighting of the First World War, the greatest victory seen on any front since the trench lines had been dug on the Aisne two years before".

The Brusilov offensive commanded by Brusilov himself went very well, but the overall campaign, for which Brusilov's part was only supposed to be a distraction, because of Evert's failures, became tremendously costly for the Imperial army, and after the offensive, it was no longer able to launch another on the same scale. Many historians contend that the casualties that the Russian army suffered in this campaign contributed significantly to its collapse the following year. The operation was marked by a considerable improvement in the quality of Russian tactics. Brusilov used smaller, specialized units to attack weak points in the Austro-Hungarian trench lines and blow open holes for the rest of the army to advance into. These were a remarkable departure from the human wave attacks that had dominated the strategy of all the major armies until that point during World War I. Evert used conventional tactics that were to prove costly and indecisive, thereby costing Russia its chance for a victory in 1916.

The irony was that other Russian commanders did not realize the potential of the tactics that Brusilov had devised. Similar tactics were proposed separately by French, Germans and British on the Western Front and employed at the Battle of Verdun earlier in the year. The tactics would henceforth be used to an even greater degree by the Germans, who used stormtroopers and infiltration tactics to great effect in the 1918 Spring Offensive.

With the benefit of hindsight, it has been stated that Russia was not able to take advantage of its success nor cement it. In the Russian society, pessimism regarding Russia's prospects in the war and distrust in the competence of its military and political leadership would continue to grow in 1916.

Russian casualties were considerable, numbering between 500,000 and 1,000,000. Austria-Hungary and Germany lost from 616,000, and from 148,000 to 350,000, respectively, making a total of 764,000 to 966,000 casualties. The Brusilov offensive is considered one of the most lethal offensives in world history.

See also

Nivelle offensive

References

Bibliography

Further reading
 Washburn, Stanley (1917). The Russian offensive, being the third volume of "Field notes from the Russian front," embracing the period from June 5th to Sept. 1st, 1916. London: Constable.
 Harrision, William W. "THE DEVELOPMENT OF RUSSIAN-SOVIET OPERATIONAL ART, 1904-1937, AND THE IMPERIAL LEGACY IN SOVIET MILITARY THOUGHT." (n.d.): n. pag. King's Research Portal. William W. Harrison, May 1994. Web. June 21, 2017 <https://kclpure.kcl.ac.uk/portal/files/2928872/319513_.pdf>.
 Clodfelter, Micheal. Warfare and Armed Conflicts: A Statistical Encyclopedia of Casualty and Other Figures, 1492-2015. 4th ed. Jefferson, page 412, North Carolina: Micheal Clodfelter, 2017. Google Books. Micheal Clodfelter, 2017. Web. 21 June 2017
 Liddell Hart, B.H. (1930). The Real War: 1914–18. pp. 224–227.
 Schindler J. "Steamrollered in Galicia: The Austro-Hungarian Army and the Brusilov Offensive, 1916", War in History, Vol. 10, No. 1. (2003), pp. 27–59.
 
 Tucker, Spencer The Great War: 1914–18 (1998) 
 Sergei Sergeyev-Tsensky, [1943]. Brusilov's Break-Through: A Novel of the First World War, translated into English by Helen Altschuler, Hutchinson & Co, London, 1945.
 
 
https://www.awm.gov.au/exhibitions/1918/battles/hamel/ Australian commander's offensive: Origins of the "Blitzkrieg" warfare.

External links

 Primary Documents: Alexei Brusilov on the Brusilov Offensive, June 1916
 4 June 1916 – The Brusilov Offensive on Trenches on the Web
 http://www.historyofwar.org/articles/battles_kovel_stanislav.html
 Map of Europe during the Brusilov Offensive at omniatlas.com

1916 in Austria-Hungary
Conflicts in 1916
Battles of World War I involving Austria-Hungary
Battles of the Eastern Front (World War I)
Battles of World War I involving Germany
Battles of World War I involving Russia
Battles of World War I involving the Ottoman Empire
Battles of World War I involving Romania
Russian Empire in World War I
1916 in the Russian Empire
Kingdom of Galicia and Lodomeria
Volhynian Governorate
June 1916 events
July 1916 events
August 1916 events
September 1916 events
Ukraine in World War I